Stoddard is English Occupational surname meaning Standard Bearer. Notable people with the surname include:

Stoddard (baseball), baseball player
Arthur Francis Stoddard (1810-1882) carpet manufacturer and philanthropist
Bob Stoddard (Robert Lyle, b. 1957), major league baseball pitcher from San Jose
Charles Warren Stoddard (1843–1909), American author and traveler of the Pacific
Corinne Stoddard (b. 2001), American speedskater
Elliott J. Stoddard  (fl. 1919–1933), inventor of Stoddard engine
Elizabeth Drew Stoddard  née Barstow (1823–1902), American poet and novelist, wife of Richard Henry
George Stoddard (1917–2009), American real-estate financier
George D. Stoddard (1897–1981), American academic, President of the University of Illinois
Harry Galpin Stoddard (1873–1969), businessman who became president of Wyman & Gordon
Howard J. Stoddard (1901–1971), American banker
Isaac T. Stoddard (1851–1914), American businessman
James Stoddard (author) (fl. 1985–), American fantasy author
James Stoddard (sailor) (born 1838, date of death unknown), American sailor and namesake of USS Stoddard (DD-566)
John Lawson Stoddard (1850–1931), American writer of hymns and travelogues; father of Lothrop
John W. Stoddard (1837–1917), American manufacturer of cars and farm tools 
Joshua C. Stoddard (1814–1902), American inventor of steam calliope
Lavinia Stoddard (1787–1820), American poet, school founder
Lothrop Stoddard (1883–1950), American white supremacist, son of John Lawson 
Malcolm Stoddard (b. 1948), British television actor
Mark Stoddard (b. 1954), American voice actor
Mary Stoddard (1852–1901), Scottish-born artist who spent twenty years in Australia
Michael Stoddard, American geographer and namesake of the Stoddard unit of measurement
Richard Henry Stoddard (1825–1903), American author and poet
Robert Stoddard (musician) (fl. 1980s), punk rock singer and guitarist
Robert Waring Stoddard (c. 1906–1984), former president of Wyman-Gordan and John Birch Society founder
Seneca Ray Stoddard (1844–1917), American landscape photographer
Solomon Stoddard  (1643–1729), American Congregational preacher
Sophia D. Stoddard née Sarah D. Hazen (d. 1891), American educator, a principal of Mount Holyoke
Thomas Benton Stoddard (1800–1876), first mayor of La Crosse, Wisconsin; Wisconsin State Assembly and namesake of Stoddard, Wisconsin
Tim Stoddard (b. 1953), major league baseball pitcher from Chicago
Whitney Stoddard (1913-2003), prominent American art historian and educator

Fictional characters:
Elizabeth Collins Stoddard, character in the television series Dark Shadows

References

External links
Stoddard Family Association

Occupational surnames
English-language occupational surnames